Kannapolis City Schools is a local education agency headquartered in Kannapolis, North Carolina. It encompasses parts of Cabarrus and Rowan Counties, yet operates independently of both county-wide school systems.  This is a legacy of the fact that Kannapolis was originally a company town for Cannon Mills (Kannapolis was not incorporated as a city until 1984).

Schools

Grades K-12
Grades K-5: G.W. Carver Elementary School (Founded 2017), building was previously used for Kannapolis Middle School and Kannapolis Intermediate School)
Grades 6-8: Kannapolis Middle School (Eagles; kelly green and navy blue) (founded 1981, moved to current facility in 2005)
Grades 9-12: A.L. Brown High School (Wonders; kelly green and White) (founded 1924 as J. W. Cannon High School, renamed and moved to current facility in 1952)

Elementary Schools
 Forest Park Elementary
 Shady Brook Elementary
 Jackson Park Elememntary
 Fred L. Wilson Elementary
 North Kannapolis Elementary (formerly Woodrow Wilson)
 G.W. Carver Elementary School

New policies
In 2017–2018 school year, Kannapolis opened a new part of the middle school. Now the upper building houses 6th grade and the lower building houses 7th and 8th. The elementary schools now house k-5 again. The former intermediate school has been renamed George Washington Carver, and is an Arts magnet elementary school. 

KCS instituted a new uniform policy for all schools within the district beginning with the 2005–2006 school year. A.L. Brown High School followed in the 2006–07 school year. Shirts and blouses must be collared and bear no logo or insignia other than that of the school; students may wear shorts, pants, skirts, skorts, or jumpers of at least fingertip length. No denim or jeans are permitted. Principals of each school will determine the color of the shirts to be worn, which will typically be assigned by grade level. In the 2020–2021 school year, the dress code was updated to allow shirts, not collared, as long as they had the Kannapolis City school logo on it.

See also
Cabarrus County Schools
Rowan-Salisbury School System
List of school districts in North Carolina

External links
Kannapolis City Schools
KCS New Uniform Policy 2005-06

Education in Cabarrus County, North Carolina
Education in Rowan County, North Carolina
School districts in North Carolina
Kannapolis, North Carolina